Llansantffraid railway station is a former station in Llansantffraid-ym-Mechain, Powys, Wales. The station opened in 1863 and closed in 1965. The station's two signal boxes, built by Dutton & Co., were moved to Oswestry and Shrewsbury.

Present day

Much of the station site is still intact, with the platform retained as a conservatory onto the former trackbed, which has been converted into a children's play area. The station building is now a restaurant.

References

Further reading

Disused railway stations in Powys
Railway stations in Great Britain opened in 1863
Railway stations in Great Britain closed in 1965
Former Cambrian Railway stations
Beeching closures in Wales